Sara Briški Cirman (born 26 April 1996), better known by her stage name Raiven, is a Slovenian mezzo-soprano, pop singer, songwriter, and harpist. She first garnered wide recognition while competing to participate in the Eurovision Song Contest for Slovenia during the national final Evrovizijska Melodija (EMA) in 2016 with the song Črno bel, where she placed second. Raiven went on to return to EMA in 2017, placing third with the song Zažarim, and has competed again in 2019 with the song KAOS, placing second.

She released her debut album Magenta in 2017 and later received an award, given out by the Slovenian cultural and artistic association for achievements in Slovenian popular music Zlata piščal in the category record of the year. In the second half of 2018 she began working with songwriters and producers in Metropolis Studios (London). As a result of her work there, she released an EP album REM, which has received critical and public acclaim.

On July 4, 2019, she performed on the Fusion Stage stage at the Exit Festival in Novi Sad, on the evening when the organizers listed the most visitors in the history of the festival - over 56,000. At the end of 2019, she performed at numerous high-profile events, including as a soloist with the RTV Slovenia Symphony Orchestra, the RTV Slovenia Big Band, the Slovenian Baroque Orchestra and the Slovenian Police Orchestra. In February 2020, she performed with her original composition Ti with the RTV Slovenia Symphony Orchestra at the Ljubljana Slovene National Theatre Opera and Ballet, under the baton and adaptation of Matija Krečič.

On September 11, 2021, she performed the song Vokovi at the Popevka 21 festival, with which she won the Grand Audience Award causing her song to receive the title Popevka 2021. In 2021 she also finished her master's degree in the Ljubljana's , majoring in opera - solo singing.

In 2022, she presented a new electro-opera concert project, in which she combined classical opera arias with electronic pop. Part of this project, entitled Doloroso, was presented at a sold-out concert on March 8, 2022 at Cankar Centre.

Education 
Between 2002 and 2011 she attended harp lessons at the Music School in Ljubljana. She continued her education in the program of the Art Gymnasium, which she attended at the Maribor Conservatory of Music and Ballet, majoring in harp with Professor Dalibor Bernatovič, jazz singing with Ana Bezjak and solo singing with professors Leona Bašovič and Tina Bohak. She has been awarded several times for her achievements in the field of classical music. Among other awards, in 2013 she won first place at the Antonio Salieri International Harp Competition in Italy and a gold plaque at the Temsig Solo Singing Country Competition. In 2015 she graduated in solo singing and continued her music education at the Ljubljana Academy of Music (solo singing - opera), where she graduated in 2018 in the class of Professor Alenka Dernač Bunta and enrolled in a master's degree in solo singing with Professor Pija Brodnik. In 2021 she received her master's degree in solo singing - opera.

Opera 
In 2019 she dedicated herself to artistic development as an opera singer and in December 2019 she sang in the world’s first tamburitza opera, Ambrož and Katarina. She is a scholarship holder of the Berlin Opera Academy. Her role Hänsl in Engelbert Humperdinck's opera Hänsel und Gretel was set to premiere in the summer of 2020, but it has been postponed to the summer of 2022 due to a new coronavirus pandemic.

In June 2021, she sang the role of Old Lady in Leonard Bernstein's opera Candid at Cankar Centre. In April 2021, she received first prize and third place at the IMMCC 2020 International Singing Competition. On June 28, 2021, she received her master’s degree with a singing recital and a master’s essay entitled The Role of Agrippina in George Frideric Händl’s opera of the same name. For her outstanding artistic achievements she received the Prešeren Prize for Students presented by the Academy of Music. 

In August 2021, she performed in the role of Rosina at concert performances of Gioachino Rossini's The Barber of Seville under the direction of maestro George Pehlivanian. In October 2021, together with soprano Pia Brodnik, tenor Gregor Ravnik and pianist Andreja Kosmač, she performed a concert as part of the Studenec Summer Festival entitled Jesenska pesem (Autumn Song). Erlier, she performed twice as part of baroque music concerts with the Slovenian Baroque Orchestra under the baton of Egon Mihajlović and concert master Monika Toth.

At the end of October 2021, accompanied by Maltese Philharmonic Orchestra, she sang at an opera aria concert at the Astra Theater in Malta, conducted by José Cura.

In April 2022, she sang the title role in Händel's opera Agrippina at Cankar Center under the artistic direction of Egon Mihajlović and directed by Rocco Rapplo. In the same month she also sang at the closing concert of the Opernfest Prague at the Vinohrady Theater in Prague, under the direction of the artistic director of the Prague Opera, maestro Jaroslav Kyzlink. A week later, she sang with the Albanian Opera Orchestra in Tirana at the Marie Kraja Opera Festival, under the baton of maestro Martin Andrea. In 2022, she began studying the role of Carmen as part of a concert performance of the opera under the direction of maestro George Pehlivanian.

As part of her studies she performed Mozart's Spatzenmesse and Vivaldi's Gloria in D major in the Slovenian Philharmonic Orchestra as solo alto with the Baroque Orchestra of the Academy of Music in 2018. In the same year, she performed as a soloist at Cankar Center with the Big Band of the Academy of Music, under the baton of Matej Hotko. In 2019, she sang the role of Iztok Kocen's mini-opera doctor Nepotrebna (Unnecessary), which premiered in Budapest. The mini-opera was presented in Brno and Ljubljana.

Since the beginning of her music education, she has regularly attended seminars by renowned musicians such as José Cura, Bernarda Fink, Vlatka Orašanić and JD Walker.

Theater and Musicals 
In 2018, she also performed on theatrical boards in the play Trojanke, produced by the Slovenian National Theatre Nova Gorica, where she portrayed the character of Cassandra. The work in the new translation by Jere Ivanc was directed by Jaša Koceli.

In 2021, she accepted the main role of Urška in the musical Povodni mož (The Water Man).

Discography

Albums

EP

Singles

References 

1996 births
Living people
21st-century Slovenian women singers
Slovenian pop singers